Rod Shoesmith is a former professional rugby league footballer who played in the 1990s. He played for the Newcastle Knights in 1991.

References

External links
http://www.rugbyleagueproject.org/players/Rod_Shoesmith/summary.html

Australian rugby league players
Newcastle Knights players
Living people
Year of birth missing (living people)
Place of birth missing (living people)
Rugby league wingers